Samuel Balagadde Ssekkadde was an Anglican Bishop in Uganda. he was Bishop of Namirembe from 1994 to 2009.

References 

20th-century Anglican bishops in Uganda
Uganda Christian University alumni
21st-century Anglican bishops in Uganda
Anglican bishops of Namirembe